This is a list of results for elections in which Daniel Inouye, a Democrat. He was elected Hawaii's first U.S. Representative in 1959, and was first elected to the U.S. Senate in 1962. He served until his death in 2012. Inouye is the 2nd longest-serving senator in history.

U.S. House elections 

Hawaii At-large congressional district, 1959 (Democratic primary):
 Daniel Inouye - 51,787 (65.33%)
 Patsy Mink - 21,702 (27.38%)
 Elizabeth K. Young - 5,783 (7.30%)

Hawaii At-large congressional district, 1959:
 Daniel Inouye (D) - 111,727 (68.64%)
 Charles H. Silva (R) - 51,058 (31.37%)

Hawaii At-large congressional district, 1960:
 Daniel Inouye (D) (inc.) - 135,827 (74.37%)
 Frederick Titcomb (R) - 46,812 (25.63%)

U.S. Senate elections 

United States Senate election in Hawaii, 1962:
 Daniel Inouye (D) - 136,294 (69.41%)
 Benjamin F. Dillingham II (R) - 60,067 (30.59%)

United States Senate election in Hawaii, 1968:
 Daniel Inouye (D) (inc.) - 189,248 (83.40%)
 Wayne C. Thiessen (R) - 34,008 (14.99%)
 Oliver M. Lee (Peace and Freedom) - 3,671 (1.62%)

United States Senate election in Hawaii, 1974:
 Daniel Inouye (D) (inc.) - 207,454 (82.91%)
 James D. Kimmel (People's) - 42,767 (17.09%)

United States Senate election in Hawaii, 1980:
 Daniel Inouye (D) (inc.) - 224,485 (77.95%)
 Copper Brown (R) - 53,068 (18.43%)
 H. E. Shasteen (LBT) - 10,453 (3.63%)

United States Senate election in Hawaii, 1986:
 Daniel Inouye (D) (inc.) - 241,887 (73.57%)
 Frank Hutchinson (R) - 86,910 (26.43%)

United States Senate election in Hawaii, 1992:
 Daniel Inouye (D) (inc.) - 208,266 (57.27%)
 Rick Reed (R) - 97,928 (26.93%)
 Linda B. Martin (Green) - 49,921 (13.73%)
 Richard Rowland (LBT) - 7,547 (2.08%)

Democratic primary for the United States Senate from Hawaii, 1998:
 Daniel Inouye (inc.) - 108,891 (92.79%)
 Richard Thompson - 8,468 (7.22%)

United States Senate election in Hawaii, 1998:
 Daniel Inouye (D) (inc.) - 315,252 (76.42%)
 Crystal Young (R) - 70,964 (17.20%)
 Blank votes - 13,862 (3.36%)
 Lloyd Mallan (LBT) - 11,908 (2.89%)
 Write-in - 537 (0.13%)

Democratic primary for the United States Senate from Hawaii, 2004:
 Daniel Inouye (inc.) - 153,748 (95.18%)
 Brian Evans - 7,790 (4.82%)

United States Senate election in Hawaii, 2004:
 Daniel Inouye (D) (inc.) - 313,629 (75.49%)
 Campbell Cavasso (R) - 87,172 (20.98%)
 Jim Brewer (I) - 9,269 (2.23%)
 Lloyd Mallan (LBT) - 5,277 (1.27%)
 Write-in - 111 (0.03%)

Presidential elections 
1972 Democratic National Convention (Vice Presidential tally):
 Thomas Eagleton - 1,742 (59.07%)
 Frances Farenthold - 405 (13.73%)
 Mike Gravel - 226 (7.66%)
 Endicott Peabody - 108 (3.66%)
 Clay Smothers - 74 (2.51%)
 Birch Bayh - 62 (2.10%)
 Peter Rodino - 57 (1.93%)
 Jimmy Carter - 30 (1.02%)
 Shirley Chisholm - 20 (0.68%)
 Moon Landrieu - 19 (0.64%)
 Edward T. Breathitt - 18 (0.61%)
 Ted Kennedy - 15 (0.51%)
 Fred R. Harris - 14 (0.48%)
 Richard G. Hatcher - 11 (0.37%)
 Harold E. Hughes - 10 (0.34%)
 Joseph M. Montoya - 9 (0.31%)
 William L. Guy - 8 (0.27%)
 Adlai Stevenson III - 8 (0.27%)
 Robert Bergland - 5 (0.17%)
 Hodding Carter - 5 (0.17%)
 Cesar Chavez - 5 (0.17%)
 Wilbur Mills - 5 (0.17%)
 Wendell Anderson - 4 (0.14%)
 Stanley Arnold - 4 (0.14%)
 Ron Dellums - 4 (0.14%)
 John J. Houlihan - 4 (0.14%)
 Roberto A. Mondragon - 4 (0.14%)
 Reubin O'Donovan Askew - 3 (0.10%)
 Herman Badillo - 3 (0.10%)
 Eugene McCarthy - 3 (0.10%)
 Claiborne Pell - 3 (0.10%)
 Terry Sanford - 3 (0.10%)
 Ramsey Clark - 2 (0.07%)
 Richard J. Daley - 2 (0.07%)
 John DeCarlo - 2 (0.07%)
 Ernest Gruening - 2 (0.07%)
 Roger Mudd - 2 (0.07%)
 Edmund Muskie - 2 (0.07%)
 Claude Pepper - 2 (0.07%)
 Abraham Ribicoff - 2 (0.07%)
 Pat Taylor - 2 (0.07%)
 Leonard F. Woodcock - 2 (0.07%)
 Bruno Agnoli - 2 (0.07%)
 Ernest Albright - 1 (0.03%)
 William A. Barrett - 1 (0.03%)
 Daniel Berrigan - 1 (0.03%)
 Phillip Berrigan - 1 (0.03%)
 Julian Bond - 1 (0.03%)
 Hargrove Bowles - 1 (0.03%)
 Archibald "Archie" Bunker - 1 (0.03%)
 Phillip Burton - 1 (0.03%)
 William Chappell - 1 (0.03%)
 Lawton Chiles - 1 (0.03%)
 Frank Church - 1 (0.03%)
 Robert Drinan - 1 (0.03%)
 Nick Galifianakis - 1 (0.03%)
 John Goodrich - 1 (0.03%)
 Michael Griffin - 1 (0.03%)
 Martha Griffiths - 1 (0.03%)
 Charles Hamilton - 1 (0.03%)
 Patricia Harris - 1 (0.03%)
 Jim Hunt - 1 (0.03%)
 Daniel Inouye - 1 (0.03%)
 Henry M. Jackson - 1 (0.03%)
 Robery Kariss - 1 (0.03%)
 Allard K. Lowenstein - 1 (0.03%)
 Mao Zedong - 1 (0.03%)
 Eleanor McGovern - 1 (0.03%)
 Martha Mitchell - 1 (0.03%)
 Ralph Nader - 1 (0.03%)
 George Norcross - 1 (0.03%)
 Jerry Rubin - 1 (0.03%)
 Fred Seaman - 1 (0.03%)
 Joe Smith - 1 (0.03%)
 Benjamin Spock - 1 (0.03%)
 Patrick Tavolacci - 1 (0.03%)
 George Wallace - 1 (0.03%)

References

Inouye, Daniel
Daniel Inouye